Əminli (also, Eminli, Aminli, and Emenny) is a village and municipality in the Masally Rayon of Azerbaijan.  It has a population of 923.  The municipality consists of the villages of Əminli and Şəhriyar.

References 

Populated places in Masally District